A remote plasma (also downstream plasma  or afterglow plasma) is a plasma processing method in which the plasma and material interaction occurs at a location remote from the plasma in the plasma afterglow.

See also
Chemical vapor deposition
Corona treatment
List of plasma (physics) applications articles
Physical vapor deposition 
Plasma activation
Plasma chemistry
Plasma cleaning
Plasma-activated bonding
Reactive ion etching

References

Plasma processing
Semiconductor device fabrication